Lagarosiphon is a genus of aquatic plants described as a genus in 1841. It is native to Africa and Madagascar. It is dioecious, with male and female flowers produced on separate plants.

Description 
These branched, aquatic herbs are covered in leaves. They may have an alterante, sub-opposite or whorled arrangement.

The unisexual flowers are surrounded by auxiliary bracts. The male flowers have a six lobed perianth arranged in two rows. The outer lobes are slightly larger. They have three stamens and two to three staminodes. There are multiple flowers per bract.

The female perianths are also made up of six lobes, with those making up the outer layer also being larger than those of the inner layer. The one chambered ovary has three partial placentas. The style is as long as the perianth tube. There are three stigmas, which maybe forked. There is one flower per bract.

Distribution 
This genus is most common in tropical Africa.

Species 
The following species are accepted:
 Lagarosiphon cordofanus (Hochst.) Casp. - Cameroon + Ethiopia to Namibia + Mpumalanga
 Lagarosiphon hydrilloides Rendle - Ghana, Kenya, Uganda
 Lagarosiphon ilicifolius Oberm. - Uganda to Namibia
 Lagarosiphon madagascariensis Casp. - Madagascar
 Lagarosiphon major (Ridl.) Moss - Zimbabwe, Botswana, Lesotho, South Africa
 Lagarosiphon muscoides Harv. - Mali to Sudan to KwaZulu-Natal
 Lagarosiphon rubellus Ridl. - Angola
 Lagarosiphon steudneri Casp. - Ethiopia
 Lagarosiphon verticillifolius Oberm. - Mozambique, Zimbabwe, KwaZulu-Natal, Eswatini, Mpumalanga, Limpopo

References

External links
Lagarosiphon at the Encyclopedia of Life

Hydrocharitaceae
Hydrocharitaceae genera
Flora of Africa
Aquatic plants
Dioecious plants